Ron Delhees (born 28 August 1995) is a Swiss handballer currently playing for Wacker Thun of the Swiss Handball League. He also plays for the Switzerland national team.

References
    

    
1995 births
Living people
People from Zug
Sportspeople from the canton of Zug
Swiss male handball players